Donal O'Brien (6 July 1940 – 8 April 2012) was an Irish hurler who played as a goalkeeper for the Tipperary senior team.

O'Brien made his first appearance for the team during the 1961 championship and was a regular member of the starting fifteen for just two full seasons before his emigration to New York. During that time he won two All-Ireland medals, two Munster medals and one National Hurling League medal.

At club level O'Brien enjoyed a brief career with Knockavilla–Donaskeigh Kickhams.

O'Brien suffered an aortic aneurysm while on vacation with his wife and granddaughter.  He died on 8 April 2012.

References

1940 births
2012 deaths
Hurling goalkeepers
Tipperary inter-county hurlers
All-Ireland Senior Hurling Championship winners
Knockavilla-Donaskeigh Kickhams hurlers